Vladimir Aleksandrov Zombori (born July 3, 1988) is a Bulgarian actor.

Life and career
Zombori was born in July 3, 1988 in Plovdiv. He studied production design in National High School of Stage and Film Design. In 2011, he graduated from the National Academy for Theatre and Film Arts with a degree in acting for drama theatre in Atanas Atanasov's class.

In September 2011, Zombori started in the Bulgarian reality show X Factor.

Zombori owes his family name (from Hungarian Zsombory) to his great-grandfather who arrived in Bulgaria from Austria-Hungary to become court confectioner to Tsar Ferdinand I.

Filmography

Feature films

Television

Voice acting

Films

References 

1988 births
Living people
Actors from Plovdiv
21st-century Bulgarian actors
Bulgarian male film actors
Bulgarian male television actors
Bulgarian male voice actors